The Oboe sonata in F major (HWV 363a) was composed ( 1711–1716) by George Frideric Handel, for oboe and basso continuo. The work is also referred to as HHA iv/18,36. (There is no HG designation for the work.)

The sonata was later reworked as a flute sonata in G major (HWV 363b).

A typical performance of the work takes about eight minutes.

Movements
The work consists of five movements:

See also
List of solo sonatas by George Frideric Handel

References

Oboe sonatas by George Frideric Handel
1716 compositions
Compositions in F major